Spatial scale is a specific application of the term scale for describing or categorizing (e.g. into orders of magnitude) the size of a space (hence spatial), or the extent of it at which a phenomenon or process occurs.

For instance, in physics an object or phenomenon can be called microscopic if too small to be visible. In climatology, a micro-climate is a climate which might occur in a mountain, valley or near a lake shore. In statistics, a megatrend is a political, social, economical, environmental or technological trend which involves the whole planet or is supposed to last a very large amount of time. The concept is also used in geography, astronomy, and meteorology.

These divisions are somewhat arbitrary; where, on this table, mega- is assigned global scope, it may only apply continentally or even regionally in other contexts. The interpretations of meso- and macro- must then be adjusted accordingly.

See also 

 Astronomical units of length
 Cosmic distance ladder
 List of examples of lengths
 Orders of magnitude (length)
 Scale (analytical tool)
 Scale (map)
 Scale (ratio)
 Location of Earth

References

Concepts in physics
Geography terminology
Cartography
Length